Krung Thonburi Football Club (Thai สโมสรฟุตบอลกรุงธนบุรี), is a Thai professional football club based in Thonburi areas, Bangkok. The club was founded in 2010.

Club Early history 
Krung Thonburi Football Club Company Limited was founded in June 2010. The formation was initiated by Weerachat Satittraiphop, the club president and a football enthusiast who intended to establish a football club that truly represent itself as the football team of Thonburi people.

The club was registered to commercially function in accordance with The Asian Football Confederation (AFC) purpose in football competition. One of the team key strengths is its presence as a private organization, unlike various clubs having ties with governmental organizations, allowing considerable flexibility. The club's management is led by experienced administration teams pursuing clear marketing objectives and effective communication to football fans.

The club had come to its existence by the negotiation with the Thai Christian Sports Club, a club holding the right to compete in Khǒr Royal Cup, to assume the ownership and administration authority of the enterprise in 2010. The club was hence entitled to participate in the Khǒr Royal Cup competition.

Khǒr Royal Cup Era (2010–2011) 
Krung Thonburi F.C. began its venture in Thai professional football in 2010 by participating in Khǒr Royal Cup. Its debut was to end in quarter-final round of the knock-out tournament by the loss to Globlex Securities F.C. who later proceeded to win its championship.

In 2011, however, the club was brimming with determination to compete again. Its effort was rewarded with the promotion to Regional League Division 2 after achieving the runner-up position in 2011 campaign.

Regional League Division 2 Era (2012–present) 
The club has competed in Regional League Division for 5 consecutive years since its promotion. After the modest first year, the club's performance has steadily improved from finishing 12th to 4th in 2015.

In 2016, the team has become a contending team in the region with strong performance. By the end of the season's first leg, they finished at 3rd position trailing the division leader by only 2 points.
After long span of league, The club finally made a new club history by success a runner up of their zone and get into the 1st championship.

In round 16 teams of Champion League 2016, Krungthonburi F.C. has draw to competition with Suratthani F.C. The team draw 0–0 at home game and away game club lose 2–0.

Club Hilight Season 2016 
–Krung Thonburi FC first lead up the zone table in club history, in the open season match by beat Thonburi City 5–0. After lose the position, club got the leader again in match week 5 and 9.

–Opara Obioma Kingsley, 28, Nigerian forwarder made 4 goals in a won 5–2 with Samutsakhon FC to be the 1st player who Hat-trick for club at professional level. And He is the man who had been Hat-trick to Krung Thonburi while he played for Seeker FC, 2014.

Club Hilight Season 2017 
–Krung Thonburi FC got the great win on Simork FC at score 6–1. Lee Min Kyu, Korean player who a new sign made 4 goals in a game.

Stadium and locations

Season By Season record

P = Played
W = Games won
D = Games drawn
L = Games lost
F = Goals for
A = Goals against
Pts = Points
Pos = Final position

QR1 = First Qualifying Round
QR2 = Second Qualifying Round
R1 = Round 1
R2 = Round 2
R3 = Round 3
R4 = Round 4

R5 = Round 5
R6 = Round 6
QF = Quarter-finals
SF = Semi-finals
RU = Runners-up
W = Winners

Honours
Khǒr Royal Cup (ถ้วย ข.)
Runner-up : 2011
Regional League Western Division
Runner-up : 2016

References

External links
 Official Facebookpage of Krung Thonburi FC
 Website of Krungthonburi Fc

Association football clubs established in 2010
Football clubs in Thailand
Pathum Thani province
2010 establishments in Thailand